Bacza is a village in Nowy Sącz municipality, Poland.
 

Villages in Nowy Sącz County